The Freightwhaler Sessions is an unreleased EP by alt-country artist Ryan Adams' side project band Freightwhaler (Freight Whaler), recorded in 1996.  At the time, Adams was also a member of Whiskeytown.

After attending a Freight Whaler concert in Raleigh, NC, No Depression writer David Menconi described the band as such: "...imagine an alternate version of the movie Revenge of the Nerds, in which the long-oppressed geeks form a gutsy roots-rock band instead of a cheeseball synth-pop band."

The unreleased EP, which has made the rounds among the file-sharing community, is notable for the song "Bar Lights", which was later re-cut for Pneumonia, Whiskeytown's final album from 2001.

Freight Whaler bassist Chris Laney revealed to AnsweringBell.com that two slower songs - "Sometimes That's Hard To Do" and "Picture Of Jesus On The Dashboard" - were recorded after drummer Skillet Gilmore broke his collarbone and couldn't play drums anymore.

Track listing

Personnel
 Ryan Adams – guitar, vocals
 Sloane Doggett – guitar
 Skillet Gilmore – drums
 Chris Laney – bass guitar
 Nicholas Petti – pedal steel
Recorded by Wes Lachot

References

EPs by American artists
Unreleased albums
Ryan Adams albums